Bo Nickal (born January 14, 1996) is an American professional mixed martial artist, former freestyle and graduated folkstyle wrestler who currently competes in the UFC middleweight division. In freestyle wrestling, he claimed the 2019 U23 World Championship and the US Open National championship, and was a finalist at the 2020 US Olympic Team Trials and a Final X contestant in 2019. As a collegiate wrestler, Nickal was a three-time NCAA Division I National Champion (finalist in 2016) and a three-time Big Ten Conference champion out of Pennsylvania State University.

Considered one of the most accomplished Nittany Lions of all-time, Nickal earned the 2019 Dan Hodge Trophy as the nation's most outstanding collegiate wrestler, was a two-time Schalles Award winner as the nation's best pinner and was also named the 2019 Big Ten Athlete of the Year.

Wrestling career

Background and high school 
Nickal was born in Rifle, Colorado, but moved to Wyoming at a young age, where he started wrestling around five or six years old. In fifth grade, he moved to Rio Rancho, New Mexico. Nickal made the varsity high school team while in the eighth grade and placed second at the New Mexico state tournament that same season. As a freshman, he moved once again, now to Allen High School in Allen, Texas, placing second at the Texas state tournament as a freshman. He won every state tournament he competed in from his sophomore-year onward, becoming a three-time UIL state champion. As a junior, he placed fifth at the 2013 Cadet World Championships in freestyle. After finishing his junior year, Nickal committed to wrestle as a Nittany Lion at the Pennsylvania State University. He graduated from high school with an 183–7 record, including 131 pins, and was the ninth-ranked wrestler in the nation pound-for-pound.

College

2014–2015 
Nickal opted to take a redshirt season in his first collegiate year, compiling a 15–2 record in open tournaments while wrestling unattached at 174 pounds.

2015–2016 
Entering his freshman season ranked fourteenth in the country, Nickal won his first eighteen matches, claiming titles from the Nittany Lion Open and the Southern Scuffle and notable victories over returning NCAA runner-up Brian Realbuto, multiple DI All-Americans in Zach Epperly, Bryce Hammond and Ethan Ramos, and future NCAA champion Myles Martin. In his nineteenth match, Nickal, now the top-ranked 174 pounder in the country, was defeated by Nate Jackson on points, ending his streak. Afterwards, Nickal bounced back with eight straight wins, including another one over Martin, to finish the regular season with a record of 26–1. At the Big Ten Conference Championships, Nickal claimed three bonus point-victories, including a fall over Martin and a major over Zac Brunson in the finale. Nickal entered the NCAA's as the top-seed, defeating his first three opponents to make the semifinals, where he avenged his regular season loss to Nate Jackson on points, advancing to the finals. In the finals, Nickal faced the eleventh seed in Myles Martin, whom he had already defeated three times earlier, but was defeated by the opposition in a close and frenetic upset, claiming runner-up honors.

Nickal then went up to 86 kilos for the 2016 US Last Chance World Trials Qualifier (freestyle) in April, where he placed fourth after going 5–2. He then tried to make the 2016 US Junior World Team, but was stopped by Zahid Valencia.

2016–2017 
As a sophomore, Nickal moved up to the 184 pounds division. During his unbeaten regular season, Nickal pinned his way to the Keystone Classic title and went 14–0 in dual meets, dominantly avenging his NCAA championship loss to Myles Martin, and also including wins over returning NCAA runner-up TJ Dudley and returning All-Americans Sammy Brooks and Nolan Boyd (both by fall). In the postseason, Nickal was upset in the semifinals of the Big Ten Championships by rival Myles Martin, but came back to place third, beating TJ Dudley for the second time. At the NCAA's, Nickal got a technical fall in the first round and three straight falls to make his second finals, notably pinning Dudley and Sammy Brooks. In the finale, Nickal faced undefeated-in-the-season and defending two-time NCAA champion Gabe Dean, whom he was able to edge by a point, claiming his first NCAA title and denying Dean his third.

Fresh off his first collegiate championship, Nickal went back up to 86 kilos to place fourth at the US Freestyle Open, going 4–2.

2017–2018 
As a junior, Nickal compiled 23 wins and no losses during regular season, with 21 bonus–point victories, claimed multiple tournament titles and wins over the likes of Domenic Abounader and his nemesis Myles Martin. At the Big Ten Championships, Nickal claimed his second title by beating Martin in the finale, advancing to the NCAAs as the favorite top–seed. At the National tournament, he earned notable wins over '16 MAC champion Jordan Ellingwood, freshman phenom from Cornell Max Dean and Michigan's Domenic Abounader to make the finale, where he scored one of his signature pins in his career over Myles Martin, ending the rivalry, claiming his second NCAA title and clinching the team title for PSU. Due to his dominance, he was awarded the NCAA Championship Outstanding Wrestler award (MVP) and the prestigious Schalles Award as the nation's top pinner.

2018–2019 
As a redshirt senior, Nickal moved up once again to 197 pounds. At this new weight class, he comfortably won the Big Ten Conference Championship for the second time consecutively and third time overall. At his last NCAA tournament, he dominated all three matches to get to the final, pinning his first two opponents and getting a major in the semifinals. In the finals, Nickal defeated the second seeded Kollin Moore by points (5-1) to claim the NCAA title, becoming one of the four Penn State wrestlers to win three NCAA National Championships and the third one (along with David Taylor and Jason Nolf) to be a four-time NCAA Finalist. At the end of the season, he was awarded the Dan Hodge Trophy as nation's best college wrestler and the Schalles Award (for the second time consecutively) as US' top pinner. He was also named 2019 Co-Big Ten wrestler of the Year, Penn State Male Athlete of the Year, and Big Ten Male Athlete of the Year.

Freestyle career

2019 
Once his final run in collegiate wrestling was over, Nickal immediately turned his focus solely to freestyle. Going back to the style after two years, Nickal competed at the US Open, bulking up to 92 kilograms instead of going down to 86 kilos due to teammate David Taylor being the returning World Champion in the weight class. He walked throughout his competition, stopping five opponents (three by technical fall and two by fall) and earning the championship.

After winning the US Open, Nickal automatically advanced to the finals of the US World Team Trials Challenge Tournament, in which he faced Michael Macchiavello in a best-of-three rematch. He dominated the first match winning by technical fall (10–0) and in the second match he would outscore his opponent 5–0, without letting him to score a point in neither match.

Nickal wrestled in two straight matches against returning World Champion J'den Cox for the spot to represent the United States at the 2019 World Championships. In the first match, he was outscored 2–4 and wasn't able to score offensively, and in the second, he wasn't able to score a single point, while Cox scored 5 of his own, losing the series.

As a 23-year old Final X contestant, Nickal had the right to compete at the US U23 World Team Trials against the Challenge Tournament winner, Jakob Woodley. The special wrestle-offs took place during the Fargo Nationals. Nickal dominated 12–4 in the first match and 8–2 in the second match, earning the right to represent United States at the U23 World Championships.

At the U23 World Championships, Nickal defeated three opponents (one by fall, one by technical fall and one by points) including Shamil Zubairov, the returning champion, to get to the finals, where he faced 2018 Russian National champion Batyrbek Tsakulov (whom he had lost to at the 2013 Cadet World Championships). Nickal was able to avenge his loss with a 12–2 technical fall victory to earn the championship.

2020 
By the start of 2020, Nickal moved up to 97 kilograms in an attempt to take out reigning Olympic Gold medalist Kyle Snyder. He effortlessly passed the first round by technical fall before facing Mohammad Hossein Mohammadian (winner of the championship), who would nullify Nickal to a 0–10 technical fall, marking the first time he had been defeated in such fashion in freestyle (since graduating) or college. In the consolation bracket, he would also have a tough time, as he had a close match with Alisher Yergali in which he was down 11–12 but was able to secure a last second takedown and earn a 13–12 point-victory. Next in the bracket was Kyle Snyder, however, Nickal did not appear on the mat, forcing the match to be ruled as a forfeit victory for Snyder and also eliminating Nickal from the tournament, placing seventh.

As a 2019 U23 World Champion, Nickal qualified for the 2020 US Olympic Team Trials. He was scheduled to compete at the event on April, however, it was postponed for 2021 due to the coronavirus pandemic along with the 2020 Summer Olympics. As a champion at a non-olympic weight, Nickal was supposed to decide whether he was going to compete at 86 or 97 kilograms, but this decision never became public as the events were postponed. On September 21, he announced that he would compete at 86 kilograms in 2021.

Nickal returned to the mats against Alex Dieringer on September 19, at the NLWC I, making his debut at 86 kilograms since completely crossing over. Dieringer scored the first point via push-out early in the first period, however, he was put on the shot-clock due to passivity with 1 minute and 30 seconds left on the match. Nickal tied it up after defending the attacks of his opponent, earning a point and therefore the criteria as the last one to do so. He was able to earn the victory via criteria after neither of them were able to score more points. Nickal was later scheduled to wrestle 2020 US National runner-up Nate Jackson on November 24, at the NLWC III, but was removed from the card a day before the event.

2021 
After a somewhat inactive previous year, Nickal wrestled two-time NCAA Division I National Champion Gabe Dean in a rematch from their 2017 NCAA championship match, on February 23, at the NLWC V. After a scramble-full match, Nickal was defeated by Dean in a close bout.

In early April, Nickal competed at the rescheduled US Olympic Team Trials as the sixth seed, in an attempt to represent the United States at the 2020 Summer Olympics. In the challenge tournament Nickal defeated '21 NCAA champion from Penn State Carter Starocci (round of 16), '19 US Open champion and third-seeded Pat Downey (quarterfinals), and '19 US National champion Zahid Valencia (semifinals). In the best–of–three finals, Nickal faced fellow Penn State legend and '18 World Champion David Taylor. Nickal lost twice by scores of 0–4 and 0–6, failing to make the US Olympic Team and break Taylor's 45–match win streak. Taylor would go on to claim the gold medal at the Summer Olympics. In regards to their close relationship, Taylor then stated:

Mixed martial arts career

Early career 
On November 10, 2019, it was announced that Nickal had signed an MMA management deal with First Round Management, expecting to make the transition to the sport. It was also announced that Nickal had serious plans on partnering with Dan Lambert and opening a new American Top Team facility at Pleasant Gap, Pennsylvania. The building process started on October 23, 2020, and the gym became active on July 2, 2021.

After the 2020 US Olympic Trials for wrestling, Nickal made his amateur mixed martial arts debut against David Conley on September 24, 2021, winning via arm-triangle choke submission in round one. In his next bout, Nickal scored a one-punch knockout over Billy Goode on November 5, 2021.

Nickal made his professional MMA debut in the middleweight division against John Noland on June 3, 2022 at the Greater Richmond Convention Center in Richmond, Virginia as part of Jorge Masvidal’s iKon FC event. Nickal won the fight via knockout less than a minute into the first round.

Dana White's Contender Series 
For his second professional match, Nickal faced Zachary Borrego on August 9, 2022 at Dana White's Contender Series 49. At weight ins, Borrego missed weight by 1.5 pounds, coming in at 187.5 lbs. The bout proceeded at catchweight and Borrego was fined a percentage of his purse, which went to Nickal. He won the fight via rear-naked choke early in the first round. Nickal would not be awarded a contract due to his inexperience, having only two professional fights. However UFC president Dana White instead decided to arrange another fight for Nickal on the Contender Series.

On August 13, 2022, it was announced that Nickal was to face Donovan Beard at Dana White's Contender Series 6 on September 27, 2022. Nickal finished Donovan Beard in 52 seconds via triangle choke, once again not absorbing a significant strike. After this performance, Nickal was awarded his first UFC contract.

Ultimate Fighting Championship

Nickal was scheduled to make his UFC debut against Jamie Pickett on December 10, 2022, at UFC 282. However, Nickal withdrew due to injury. The pair was rescheduled to meet on March 4, 2023 at UFC 285. He won the fight via an arm-triangle choke submission in the first round, This win earned him the Performance of the Night award. Following the fight, Pickett's manager announced plans to appeal the fight to Nevada State Athletic Commission on the grounds that Nickal took advantage of an uncalled groin shot to win the fight.

Personal life
Nickal is the son of Jason and Sandy Nickal. They were both college athletes, as his mother played basketball at San Diego State University and his father played football at Chadron State College. Jason coached Nickal as a youth until he went off to college at Penn State. His mother Sandy is also a former amateur boxer.

Nickal is a Christian. He stated his faith in God helps alleviate the pressure he feels in competition, "Win or lose, I'm still the same person and my family loves me and I still serve a great God, and, you know, that's just part of his plan for my life is to wrestle. So I do feel like it's important, but at the end of the day that's not what defines me. I just have placed my identity in Jesus Christ and I go out there and compete freely and the best I can every match." As a child, his favorite wrestler was two-time Olympic Gold Medalist John Smith. Apart from wrestling, he is also an enthusiast of spikeball and likes American football, his favorite player being former Detroit Lions player Barry Sanders.

Nickal married his wife Maddie Holmberg on December 12, 2020.

Championships and accomplishments

Mixed martial arts
Ultimate Fighting Championship
Performance of the Night (One time)

Mixed martial arts record 

|-
|
|align=center|4–0
|Jamie Pickett
|Submission (arm-triangle choke)
|UFC 285
|
|align=center|1
|align=center|2:54
|Las Vegas, Nevada, United States
|
|-
|
|align=center|3–0
|Donovan Beard
|Submission (triangle choke)
|Dana White's Contender Series 56
|
|align=center|1
|align=center|0:52
|Las Vegas, Nevada, United States
|
|-
|
|align=center|2–0
|Zachary Borrego
|Submission (rear-naked choke)
|Dana White's Contender Series 49
|
|align=center|1
|align=center|1:02
|Las Vegas, Nevada, United States
|
|-
|Win
|align=center|1–0
|John Noland
|KO (punches)
|Jorge Masvidal's iKon FC 3
|
|align=center|1
|align=center|0:33
|Richmond, Virginia, United States
|
|-

Freestyle record

! colspan="7"| Senior Freestyle Matches
|-
!  Res.
!  Record
!  Opponent
!  Score
!  Date
!  Event
!  Location
|-
! style=background:white colspan=7 |
|-
|Loss
|28–10
|align=left| David Taylor
|style="font-size:88%"|0–6
|style="font-size:88%" rowspan=5|April 2–3, 2021
|style="font-size:88%" rowspan=5|2020 US Olympic Team Trials
|style="text-align:left;font-size:88%;" rowspan=5| Fort Worth, Texas
|-
|Loss
|28–9
|align=left| David Taylor
|style="font-size:88%"|0–4
|-
|Win
|28–8
|align=left| Zahid Valencia
|style="font-size:88%"|12–5
|-
|Win
|27–8
|align=left| Pat Downey
|style="font-size:88%"|TF 13–3
|-
|Win
|26–8
|align=left| Carter Starocci
|style="font-size:88%"|6–1
|-
|Loss
|25–8
|align=left| Gabe Dean
|style="font-size:88%"|2–3
|style="font-size:88%"|February 23, 2021
|style="font-size:88%"|NLWC V
|style="text-align:left;font-size:88%;" rowspan=2|
 State College, Pennsylvania
|-
|Win
|25–7
|align=left| Alex Dieringer
|style="font-size:88%"|1–1
|style="font-size:88%"|September 19, 2020
|style="font-size:88%"|NLWC I
|-
! style=background:white colspan=7 |
|-
|Win
|24–7
|align=left| Alisher Yergali
|style="font-size:88%"|13–12
|style="font-size:88%" rowspan=3|January 15–18, 2020 
|style="font-size:88%" rowspan=3|Matteo Pellicone Ranking Series 2020
|style="text-align:left;font-size:88%;" rowspan=3|
 Rome, Italy
|-
|Loss
|23–7
|align=left| Mohammad Mohammadian
|style="font-size:88%"|TF 0–10
|-
|Win
|23–6
|align=left| George Stark Serege
|style="font-size:88%"|TF 11–1
|-
! style=background:white colspan=7 |
|-
|Win
|22–6
|align=left| Batyrbek Tsakulov
|style="font-size:88%"|TF 12–2
|style="font-size:88%"|October 30, 2019
|style="font-size:88%" rowspan=4|2019 U23 World Championships
|style="text-align:left;font-size:88%;" rowspan=4|
 Budapest, Hungary
|-
|Win
|21–6
|align=left| Shamil Zubairov
|style="font-size:88%"|9–1 
|style="font-size:88%" rowspan=3|October 29, 2019 
|-
|Win
|20–6
|align=left| Takumi Tanizaki
|style="font-size:88%"|Fall
|-
|Win
|19–6
|align=left| Hossein Shahbazigazvar
|style="font-size:88%"|TF 12–2
|-
! style=background:white colspan=7 |
|-
|Win
|18–6
|align=left| Jake Woodley
|style="font-size:88%"|12–4
|style="font-size:88%" rowspan=2|July 16, 2019
|style="font-size:88%" rowspan=2|2019 Fargo Nationals (special wrestle-off)
|style="text-align:left;font-size:88%;" rowspan=2|
 Fargo, North Dakota
|-
|Win
|17–6
|align=left| Jake Woodley
|style="font-size:88%"|8–2
|-
! style=background:white colspan=7 |
|-
|Loss
|16–6
|align=left| J'den Cox
|style="font-size:88%"|0–5
|style="font-size:88%"|June 8, 2019
|style="font-size:88%" rowspan=2|2019 Final X: Rutgers
|style="text-align:left;font-size:88%;" rowspan=2|
 New Brunswick, New Jersey
|-
|Loss
|16–5
|align=left| J'den Cox
|style="font-size:88%"|2–4
|style="font-size:88%"|June 7, 2019
|-
|Win
|16–4
|align=left| Michael Macchiavello
|style="font-size:88%"|5–0
|style="font-size:88%"|May 19, 2019
|style="font-size:88%" rowspan=2|2019 US World Team Trials Challenge Tournament
|style="text-align:left;font-size:88%;" rowspan=2|
 Lincoln, Nebraska
|-
|Win
|15–4
|align=left| Michael Macchiavello 
|style="font-size:88%"|TF 10–0
|style="font-size:88%"|May 18, 2019
|-
! style=background:white colspan=7 | 
|-
|Win
|14–4
|align=left| Hayden Zillmer
|style="font-size:88%"|TF 13–3
|style="font-size:88%" rowspan=5|April 24–27, 2019 
|style="font-size:88%" rowspan=5|2019 US Open National Championships
|style="text-align:left;font-size:88%;" rowspan=5|
 Las Vegas, Nevada
|-
|Win
|13–4
|align=left| Michael Macchiavello 
|style="font-size:88%"|TF 14–4
|-
|Win
|12–4
|align=left| Scottie Boykin
|style="font-size:88%"|TF 10–0
|-
|Win
|11–4
|align=left| Patrick Rhoads
|style="font-size:88%"|Fall
|-
|Win
|10–4
|align=left| Jamal Lewis
|style="font-size:88%"|Fall
|-
! style=background:white colspan=7 | 
|-
|Loss
|9–4
|align=left| Nick Heflin
|style="font-size:88%"|8–10
|style="font-size:88%" rowspan=3|April 29, 2017
|style="font-size:88%" rowspan=6|2017 US Open National Championships
|style="text-align:left;font-size:88%;" rowspan=6|
 Las Vegas, Nevada
|-
|Win
|9–3
|align=left| Pat Downey
|style="font-size:88%"|TF 12–2
|-
|Loss
|8–3
|align=left| Richard Perry
|style="font-size:88%"|8–10
|-
|Win
|8–2
|align=left| John Staudenmayer
|style="font-size:88%"|TF 10–0 
|style="font-size:88%" rowspan=3|April 28, 2017
|-
|Win
|7–2
|align=left| Timmy McCall
|style="font-size:88%"|TF 10–0
|-
|Win
|6–2
|align=left| Randy Keesler
|style="font-size:88%"|TF 10–0
|-
! style=background:white colspan=7 | 
|-
|Loss
|5–2
|align=left| Nick Heflin
|style="font-size:88%"|Fall
|style="font-size:88%" rowspan=7|April 3, 2016
|style="font-size:88%" rowspan=7|2016 US Last Chance Olympic Team Trials Qualifier
|style="text-align:left;font-size:88%;" rowspan=7|
 Cedar Falls, Iowa
|-
|Win
|5–1
|align=left| Robert Hamlin
|style="font-size:88%"|10–8
|-
|Win
|4–1
|align=left| Victor Terrell
|style="font-size:88%"|TF 10–0
|-
|Win
|3–1
|align=left| Frank Richmond
|style="font-size:88%"|14–10
|-
|Loss
|2–1
|align=left| Kevin Steinhaus
|style="font-size:88%"|TF 1–12
|-
|Win
|2–0
|align=left| Austin Faunce
|style="font-size:88%"|TF 10–0
|-
|Win
|1–0
|align=left| Wesley Schultz
|style="font-size:88%"|TF 10–0
|-

NCAA record 

! colspan="8"| NCAA Division I Record
|-
!  Res.
!  Record
!  Opponent
!  Score
!  Date
!  Event
|-
! style=background:lighgrey colspan=6 |End of 2018–2019 Season (senior year)
|-
! style=background:white colspan=6 |2019 NCAA Championships  at 197 lbs
|-
|Win
|120–3
|align=left|Kollin Moore
|style="font-size:88%"|5–1
|style="font-size:88%" rowspan=5|March 21–23, 2019
|style="font-size:88%" rowspan=5|2019 NCAA Division I National Championships
|-
|Win
|119–3
|align=left|Patrick Brucki
|style="font-size:88%"|Fall
|-
|Win
|118–3
|align=left|Nathan Traxler
|style="font-size:88%"|MD 14–4
|-
|Win
|117–3
|align=left|Josh Hokit
|style="font-size:88%"|Fall
|-
|Win
|116–3
|align=left|Ethan Laird
|style="font-size:88%"|Fall
|-
! style=background:white colspan=6 | 2019 Big Ten Conference  at 197 lbs
|-
|Win
|115–3
|align=left|Kollin Moore
|style="font-size:88%"|10–3
|style="font-size:88%" rowspan=3|March 9–10, 2019
|style="font-size:88%" rowspan=3|2019 Big Ten Conference Championships
|-
|Win
|114–3
|align=left|Eric Schultz 
|style="font-size:88%"|MD 10–2
|-
|Win
|113–3
|align=left|Brad Wilton
|style="font-size:88%"|TF 19–4
|-
|Win
|112–3
|align=left|Brett Perry
|style="font-size:88%"|Fall
|style="font-size:88%"|February 24, 2019
|style="font-size:88%"|Buffalo - Penn State Dual
|-
|Win
|111–3
|align=left|Matt Wroblewski
|style="font-size:88%"|TF 19–3
|style="font-size:88%"|February 17, 2019
|style="font-size:88%"|Penn State- Illinois Dual
|-
|Win
|110–3
|align=left|Brad Wilton
|style="font-size:88%"|Fall
|style="font-size:88%"|February 15, 2019
|style="font-size:88%"|Michigan State - Penn State Dual
|-
|Win
|109–3
|align=left|Kollin Moore
|style="font-size:88%"|Fall
|style="font-size:88%"|February 8, 2019
|style="font-size:88%"|Penn State - Ohio State Dual
|-
|Win
|108–3
|align=left|Jackson Striggow
|style="font-size:88%"|Fall
|style="font-size:88%"|February 2, 2019
|style="font-size:88%"|Michigan - Penn State Dual
|-
|Win
|107–3
|align=left|Kleimola Jake
|style="font-size:88%"|Fall
|style="font-size:88%"|January 27, 2019
|style="font-size:88%"|Penn State - Indiana State Dual
|-
|Win
|106–3
|align=left|Christian Brunner
|style="font-size:88%"|MD 17–6
|style="font-size:88%"|January 25, 2019
|style="font-size:88%"|Penn State - Purdue Dual
|-
|Win
|105–3
|align=left|Eric Schultz
|style="font-size:88%"|8–6
|style="font-size:88%"|January 20, 2019
|style="font-size:88%"|Nebraska - Penn State Dual
|-
|Win
|104–3
|align=left|Beau Breske
|style="font-size:88%"|MD 14–4
|style="font-size:88%"|January 13, 2019
|style="font-size:88%"|Wisconsin - Penn State Dual
|-
|Win
|103–3
|align=left|Zack Chakonis
|style="font-size:88%"|Fall
|style="font-size:88%"|January 11, 2019
|style="font-size:88%"|Penn State - Northwestern Dual
|-
! style=background:white colspan=6 | 2019 Southern Scuffle  at 197 lbs
|-
|Win
|102–3
|align=left|Nathan Traxler
|style="font-size:88%"|Fall
|style="font-size:88%" rowspan=5|January 1–2, 2019
|style="font-size:88%" rowspan=5|2019 Southern Scuffle
|-
|Win
|101–3
|align=left|Tom Sleigh
|style="font-size:88%"|Fall
|-
|Win
|100–3
|align=left|Joshua Roetman
|style="font-size:88%"|Fall
|-
|Win
|99–3
|align=left|Luke McGonigal
|style="font-size:88%"|Fall
|-
|Win
|98–3
|align=left|Tyrie Houghton
|style="font-size:88%"|Fall
|-
|Win
|97–3
|align=left|Austyn Harris
|style="font-size:88%"|Fall
|style="font-size:88%"|December 14, 2018
|style="font-size:88%"|Arizona State - Penn State Dual
|-
|Win
|96–3
|align=left|Jake Jakobsen
|style="font-size:88%"|TF 19–4 
|style="font-size:88%"|December 14, 2018
|style="font-size:88%"|Lehigh - Penn State Dual
|-
|Win
|95–3
|align=left|Drew Phipps
|style="font-size:88%"|MD 16–6
|style="font-size:88%"|November 30, 2018
|style="font-size:88%"|Penn State - Bucknell Dual
|-
! style=background:white colspan=6 | 2018 Keystone Classic  at 197 lbs
|-
|Win
|94–3
|align=left|Stephen Loiseau
|style="font-size:88%"|MD 18–4
|style="font-size:88%" rowspan=3|November 18, 2018
|style="font-size:88%" rowspan=3|2018 Keystone Classic
|-
|Win
|93–3
|align=left|Ethan Laird
|style="font-size:88%"|Fall
|-
|Win
|92–3
|align=left|Benjamin Markulec
|style="font-size:88%"|Fall
|-
|Win
|91–3
|align=left|Shane Mast
|style="font-size:88%"|Fall
|style="font-size:88%"|November 11, 2018
|style="font-size:88%"|Maryland - Ohio State Dual
|-
! style=background:lighgrey colspan=6 |Start of 2018–2019 Season (senior year)
|-
! style=background:lighgrey colspan=6 |End of 2017–2018 Season (junior year)
|-
! style=background:white colspan=6 | 2018 NCAA Championships  at 184 lbs
|-
|Win
|90–3
|align=left|Myles Martin
|style="font-size:88%"|Fall
|style="font-size:88%" rowspan=5|March 15–17, 2018
|style="font-size:88%" rowspan=5|2018 NCAA Division I National Championships
|-
|Win
|89–3
|align=left|Domenic Abounader
|style="font-size:88%"|6–3
|-
|Win
|88–3
|align=left|Max Dean
|style="font-size:88%"|13–7
|-
|Win
|87–3
|align=left|Jordan Ellingwood
|style="font-size:88%"|10–4
|-
|Win
|86–3
|align=left|Martin Mueller
|style="font-size:88%"|MD 16–4
|-
! style=background:white colspan=6 | 2018 Big Ten Conference  at 184 lbs
|-
|Win
|85–3
|align=left|Myles Martin
|style="font-size:88%"|7–4
|style="font-size:88%" rowspan=3|March 3–4, 2018
|style="font-size:88%" rowspan=3|2018 Big Ten Conference Championships
|-
|Win
|83–3
|align=left|Emery Parker
|style="font-size:88%"|5–2
|-
|Win
|84–3
|align=left|Brandon Krone
|style="font-size:88%"|Fall
|-
|Win
|82–3
|align=left|Brett Perry
|style="font-size:88%"|Fall
|style="font-size:88%"|February 18, 2018
|style="font-size:88%"|Buffalo - Penn State Dual
|-
|Win
|81–3
|align=left|Mitch Bowman
|style="font-size:88%"|Fall
|style="font-size:88%"|February 10, 2018
|style="font-size:88%"|Iowa - Penn State Dual
|-
|Win
|80–3
|align=left|Myles Martin
|style="font-size:88%"|MD 10–2
|style="font-size:88%"|February 3, 2018
|style="font-size:88%"|Ohio State - Penn State Dual
|-
|Win
|79–3
|align=left|Nicholas Gravina
|style="font-size:88%"|6–5
|style="font-size:88%"|January 28, 2018
|style="font-size:88%"|Penn State - Rutgers Dual
|-
|Win
|78–3
|align=left|Dylan Anderson
|style="font-size:88%"|Fall
|style="font-size:88%"|January 26, 2018
|style="font-size:88%"|Minnesota - Penn State Dual
|-
|Win
|77–3
|align=left|Niko Capello
|style="font-size:88%"|Fall
|style="font-size:88%"|January 21, 2018
|style="font-size:88%"|Penn State - Maryland Dual
|-
|Win
|76–3
|align=left|Max Lyon
|style="font-size:88%"|Fall
|style="font-size:88%"|January 19, 2018
|style="font-size:88%"|Purdue - Penn State Dual
|-
|Win
|75–3
|align=left|Shwan Shadaia
|style="font-size:88%"|Fall
|style="font-size:88%"|January 14, 2018
|style="font-size:88%"|Penn State -Michigan State Dual
|-
|Win
|74–3
|align=left|Domenic Abounader
|style="font-size:88%"|5–2
|style="font-size:88%"|January 12, 2018
|style="font-size:88%"|Penn State - Michigan Dual
|-
! style=background:white colspan=6 | 2018 Southern Scuffle  at 184 lbs
|-
|Win
|73–3
|align=left|Drew Foster
|style="font-size:88%"|MD 10–2
|style="font-size:88%" rowspan=5|January 1–2, 2018
|style="font-size:88%" rowspan=5|2018 Southern Scuffle
|-
|Win
|72–3
|align=left|Nick Renan
|style="font-size:88%"|MD 12-4
|-
|Win
|71–3
|align=left|Stanley Smeltzer
|style="font-size:88%"|Fall
|-
|Win
|70–3
|align=left|Austin Flores
|style="font-size:88%"|Fall
|-
|Win
|69–3
|align=left|Nick Mosco
|style="font-size:88%"|Fall
|-
|Win
|68–3
|align=left|Norman Conley
|style="font-size:88%"|Fall
|style="font-size:88%"|December 17, 2017
|style="font-size:88%"|Indiana - Penn State Dual
|-
|Win
|67–3
|align=left|Ryan Preisch
|style="font-size:88%"|TF 19–4 
|style="font-size:88%"|December 14, 2017
|style="font-size:88%"|Penn State - Lehigh Dual
|-
! style=background:white colspan=6 | 2017 Keystone Classic  at 184 lbs
|-
|Win
|66–3
|align=left|Mitch Sliga
|style="font-size:88%"|Fall
|style="font-size:88%" rowspan=4|November 19, 2017
|style="font-size:88%" rowspan=4|2017 Keystone Classic
|-
|Win
|65–3
|align=left|Josh Murphy
|style="font-size:88%"|Fall
|-
|Win
|64–3
|align=left|Kanon Dean
|style="font-size:88%"|TF 24–9
|-
|Win
|63–3
|align=left|Ben Wagner
|style="font-size:88%"|Fall
|-
|Win
|62–3
|align=left|Steve Schneider
|style="font-size:88%"|MD 15–6
|style="font-size:88%"|November 17, 2017
|style="font-size:88%"|Penn State - Binghamton Dual
|-
|Win
|61–3
|align=left|Drew Phipps
|style="font-size:88%"|TF 16–6
|style="font-size:88%"|November 12, 2017
|style="font-size:88%"|Bucknell - Penn State Dual
|-
|Win
|60–3
|align=left|Noah Steward
|style="font-size:88%"|Fall
|style="font-size:88%"|November 11, 2017
|style="font-size:88%"|Army - Penn State Dual
|-
! style=background:lighgrey colspan=6 |Start of 2017–2018 Season (junior year)
|-
! style=background:lighgrey colspan=6 |End of 2016–2017 Season (sophomore year)
|-
! style=background:white colspan=6 | 2017 NCAA Championships  at 184 lbs
|-
|Win
|59–3
|align=left|Gabe Dean
|style="font-size:88%"|4–3
|style="font-size:88%" rowspan=5|March 16–18, 2017
|style="font-size:88%" rowspan=5|2017 NCAA Division I National Championships
|-
|Win
|58–3
|align=left|Sammy Brooks
|style="font-size:88%"|Fall
|-
|Win
|57–3
|align=left|TJ Dudley
|style="font-size:88%"|Fall
|-
|Win
|56–3
|align=left|Steve Schneider
|style="font-size:88%"|Fall
|-
|Win
|55–3
|align=left|Mitch Sliga
|style="font-size:88%"|TF 15–0
|-
! style=background:white colspan=6 | 2017 Big Ten Conference  at 184 lbs
|-
|Win
|54–3
|align=left|TJ Dudley
|style="font-size:88%"|14–9
|style="font-size:88%" rowspan=4|March 4–5, 2017
|style="font-size:88%" rowspan=4|2017 Big Ten Conference Championships
|-
|Win
|53–3
|align=left|Emery Parker
|style="font-size:88%"|8–2
|-
|Loss
|52–3
|align=left|Myles Martin
|style="font-size:88%"|4–6
|-
|Win
|52–2
|align=left|Hunter Ritter
|style="font-size:88%"|Fall
|-
|Win
|51–2
|align=left|Nolan Boyd
|style="font-size:88%"|Fall
|style="font-size:88%"|February 19, 2017
|style="font-size:88%"|Penn State- Oklahoma State Dual
|-
|Win
|50–2
|align=left|Idris White
|style="font-size:88%"|Fall
|style="font-size:88%"|February 12, 2017
|style="font-size:88%"|Maryland - Penn State Dual
|-
|Win
|49–2
|align=left|Emery Parker
|style="font-size:88%"|MD 18–5
|style="font-size:88%"|February 10, 2017
|style="font-size:88%"|Illinois -Penn State Dual
|-
|Win
|48–2
|align=left|Myles Martin
|style="font-size:88%"|8–2
|style="font-size:88%"|February 3, 2017
|style="font-size:88%"|Penn State - Ohio State Dual
|-
|Win
|47–2
|align=left|Mitch Sliga
|style="font-size:88%"|MD 10–1
|style="font-size:88%"|Januany 29, 2017
|style="font-size:88%"|Penn State - Northwestern Dual
|-
|Win
|46–2
|align=left|Hunter Ritter
|style="font-size:88%"|Fall
|style="font-size:88%"|January 27, 2017
|style="font-size:88%"|Penn State - Wisconsin Dual
|-
|Win
|45–2
|align=left|Sammy Brooks
|style="font-size:88%"|Fall
|style="font-size:88%"|January 20, 2017
|style="font-size:88%"|Penn State - Iowa Dual
|-
|Win
|44–2
|align=left|Nicholas Gravina
|style="font-size:88%"|Fall
|style="font-size:88%"|January 13, 2017
|style="font-size:88%"|Rutgers - Penn State Dual
|-
|Win
|43–2
|align=left|TJ Dudley
|style="font-size:88%"|10–5
|style="font-size:88%"|January 8, 2017
|style="font-size:88%"|Penn State - Nebraska Dual
|-
|Win
|42–2
|align=left|Robert Steveson
|style="font-size:88%"|Fall
|style="font-size:88%"|January 6, 2017
|style="font-size:88%"|Penn State - Minnesota Dual
|-
|Win
|41–2
|align=left|Steve Schneider
|style="font-size:88%"|TF 18–7
|style="font-size:88%"|December 12, 2016
|style="font-size:88%"|Binghamton - Penn State Dual
|-
|Win
|40–2
|align=left|Kyle Gentile
|style="font-size:88%"|Fall
|style="font-size:88%"|December 4, 2016
|style="font-size:88%"|Lehigh - Bucknell Dual
|-
! style=background:white colspan=6 | 2016 Keystone Classic  at 184 lbs
|-
|Win
|39–2
|align=left|Mitch Sliga
|style="font-size:88%"|Fall
|style="font-size:88%" rowspan=4|November 20, 2016
|style="font-size:88%" rowspan=4|2016 Keystone Classic
|-
|Win
|38–2
|align=left|Anthony Mancini
|style="font-size:88%"|Fall
|-
|Win
|37–2
|align=left|Kayne MacCallum
|style="font-size:88%"|Fall
|-
|Win
|36–2
|align=left|Elliot Antler
|style="font-size:88%"|Fall
|-
|Win
|35–2
|align=left|Austin Flores
|style="font-size:88%"|Fall
|style="font-size:88%"|November 13, 2016
|style="font-size:88%"|Standford - Penn State Dual
|-
|Win
|34–2
|align=left|Samson Imonode
|style="font-size:88%"|Fall
|style="font-size:88%"|November 11, 2016
|style="font-size:88%"|Penn State - Army Dual
|-
! style=background:lighgrey colspan=6 |Start of 2016–2017 Season (sophomore year)
|-
! style=background:lighgrey colspan=6 |End of 2015–2016 Season (freshman year)
|-
! style=background:white colspan=6 |2016 NCAA Championships  at 174 lbs
|-
|Loss
|33–2
|align=left|Myles Martin
|style="font-size:88%"|9–11
|style="font-size:88%" rowspan=5|March 17–19, 2016
|style="font-size:88%" rowspan=5|2016 NCAA Division I National Championships
|-
|Win
|33–1
|align=left|Nate Jackson
|style="font-size:88%"|4–3
|-
|Win
|32–1
|align=left|Chandler Rogers
|style="font-size:88%"|MD 15–4
|-
|Win
|31–1
|align=left|Micah Barnes
|style="font-size:88%"|7–2
|-
|Win
|30–1
|align=left|Josef Johnson
|style="font-size:88%"|MD 10–2
|-
! style=background:white colspan=6 | 2016 Big Ten Conference  at 174 lbs
|-
|Win
|29–1
|align=left|Zac Brunson
|style="font-size:88%"|MD 18–9
|style="font-size:88%" rowspan=3|March 5–6, 2016
|style="font-size:88%" rowspan=3|2016 Big Ten Conference Championships
|-
|Win
|28–1
|align=left|Myles Martin
|style="font-size:88%"|Fall
|-
|Win
|27–1
|align=left|Phillip Bakuckas
|style="font-size:88%"|MD 15–3
|-
|Win
|26–1
|align=left|Hestin Lamons
|style="font-size:88%"|TF 17–2
|style="font-size:88%"|February 21, 2016
|style="font-size:88%"|Oklahoma State - Penn State Dual
|-
|Win
|25–1
|align=left|Travis Curley
|style="font-size:88%"|TF 24–9
|style="font-size:88%"|Feb 13, 2016
|style="font-size:88%"|Michigan State - Penn State Dual
|-
|Win
|24–1
|align=left|Gordon Wolf
|style="font-size:88%"|MD 14–6
|style="font-size:88%"|Feb 12, 2016
|style="font-size:88%"|Penn State - Lehigh Dual
|-
|Win
|23–1
|align=left|Myles Martin
|style="font-size:88%"|11–5
|style="font-size:88%"|February 5, 2016
|style="font-size:88%"|Ohio State - Penn State Dual
|-
|Win
|22–1
|align=left|Davonte Mahomes
|style="font-size:88%"|INJ
|style="font-size:88%"|January 31, 2016
|style="font-size:88%"|Michigan - Penn State Dual
|-
|Win
|21–1
|align=left|Zac Brunson
|style="font-size:88%"|Fall
|style="font-size:88%"|Jan 23, 2016
|style="font-size:88%"|Penn State - Illinois Dual
|-
|Win
|20–1
|align=left|Mitch Sliga
|style="font-size:88%"|Fall
|style="font-size:88%"|Jan 17, 2016
|style="font-size:88%"|Penn State - Northwestern Dual
|-
|Win
|19–1
|align=left|Micah Barnes
|style="font-size:88%"|10–3
|style="font-size:88%"|January 15, 2016
|style="font-size:88%"|Nebraska - Penn State Dual
|-
|Loss
|18–1
|align=left|Nate Jackson
|style="font-size:88%"|6–7
|style="font-size:88%"|January 12, 2016
|style="font-size:88%"|Penn State - Indiana Dual
|-
|Win
|18–0
|align=left|Jacob Morrissey
|style="font-size:88%"|TF 16–1
|style="font-size:88%"|January 8, 2016
|style="font-size:88%"|Penn State - Purdue Dual
|-
! style=background:white colspan=6 | 2016 Southern Scuffle  at 174 lbs
|-
|Win
|17–0
|align=left|Ethan Ramos
|style="font-size:88%"|11–7
|style="font-size:88%" rowspan=6|January 1–2, 2016
|style="font-size:88%" rowspan=6|2016 Southern Scuffle
|-
|Win
|16–0
|align=left|Brian Realbuto
|style="font-size:88%"|14–7
|-
|Win
|15–0
|align=left|Mike Ottinger
|style="font-size:88%"|4–3
|-
|Win
|14–0
|align=left|Fox Baldwin
|style="font-size:88%"|MD 15–6
|-
|Win
|13–0
|align=left|Movahedi Sohrab
|style="font-size:88%"|TF 20–2
|-
|Win
|12–0
|align=left|Randy Roden
|style="font-size:88%"|TF 17–1
|-
|Win
|11–0
|align=left|Wayne Stinson
|style="font-size:88%"|Fall
|style="font-size:88%"|December 19, 2015
|style="font-size:88%"|Penn State - Rider Dual
|-
|Win
|10–0
|align=left|Ricky Robertson
|style="font-size:88%"|MD 15–2
|style="font-size:88%"|December 19, 2015
|style="font-size:88%"|Wisconsin - Penn State Dual
|-
! style=background:white colspan=6 | 2015 Nittany Lion Open  at 174 lbs
|-
|Win
|9–0
|align=left|Myles Martin
|style="font-size:88%"|4–3
|style="font-size:88%" rowspan=5|December 6, 2015
|style="font-size:88%" rowspan=5|2015 Nittany Lion Open
|-
|Win
|8–0
|align=left|Anthony Pafumi
|style="font-size:88%"|Fall
|-
|Win
|7–0
|align=left|Domenic Prezzia
|style="font-size:88%"|Fall
|-
|Win
|6–0
|align=left|Nick Stephani
|style="font-size:88%"|TF 25–8
|-
|Win
|5–0
|align=left|Graham Ratermann
|style="font-size:88%"|Fall
|-
|Win
|4–0
|align=left|Keaton Subjeck
|style="font-size:88%"|MD 12–4
|style="font-size:88%"|November 22, 2015
|style="font-size:88%"|Penn State - Stanford  Dual
|-
|Win
|3–0
|align=left|Bryce Hammond
|style="font-size:88%"|Fall
|style="font-size:88%"|November 20, 2015
|style="font-size:88%"|Penn State – CSU Bakersfield Dual
|-
|Win
|2–0
|align=left|Zach Epperly
|style="font-size:88%"|6–2
|style="font-size:88%"|November 15, 2015
|style="font-size:88%"|Penn State – Virginia State Dual
|-
|Win
|1–0
|align=left|Tyler Wood
|style="font-size:88%"|TF 21–6
|style="font-size:88%"|November 13, 2015
|style="font-size:88%"|Lock Havon – Penn State  Dual
|-
! style=background:lighgrey colspan=6 | Start of 2015–2016 Season (freshman year)

Stats 

!  Season
!  Year
!  School
!  Rank
!  Weigh Class
!  Record
!  Win
!  Bonus
|-
|2019
|Senior
|rowspan=4|Penn State University
|#1 (1st)
|197
|30–0
|100.00%
|90.00%
|-
|2018
|Junior
|#1 (1st)
|184
|31–0
|100.00%
|74.19%
|-
|2017
|Sophomore
|#2 (1st)
|184
|26–1
|96.30%
|77.78%
|-
|2016
|Freshman
|#1 (2nd)
|174
|33–2
|94.29%
|65.71%
|-
|colspan=5 bgcolor="LIGHTGREY"|Career
|bgcolor="LIGHTGREY"|120–3
|bgcolor="LIGHTGREY"|97.65%
|bgcolor="LIGHTGREY"|76.77%

Submission grappling record
{| class="wikitable sortable" style="font-size:80%; text-align:left;"
|-
| colspan=9 style="text-align:center;" | 3 Matches, 0 Wins, 1 Loss (1 Submission), 2 Draws
|-
!  Result
!  Rec.
!  Opponent
!  Method
!  Event
!  Division
!  Type
!  Year
!  Location
|-
|Draw|| style="text-align:center;" |0–1–2|| Oliver Taza || Draw (time limit)|| rowspan="2" | UFC Fight Pass Invitational 2|| rowspan="2" | Open|| rowspan="2" |Nogi|| rowspan="2" | July 3, 2022|| rowspan="2" | Las Vegas, Nevada
|-
|Draw||style="text-align:center;"|0–1–1|| Elliot Kelly ||Draw (time limit)
|-
|Loss||style="text-align:center;"|0–1|| Gordon Ryan ||Submission (triangle choke)|| Third Coast Grappling 3|| Superfight||Nogi||December 7, 2019|| Houston, Texas
|-

References

External links
 

1996 births
Living people
American male mixed martial artists
Middleweight mixed martial artists
Mixed martial artists utilizing collegiate wrestling
Mixed martial artists utilizing freestyle wrestling
Mixed martial artists utilizing Brazilian jiu-jitsu
Mixed martial artists from Colorado
American male sport wrestlers
Penn State Nittany Lions wrestlers
American practitioners of Brazilian jiu-jitsu
Big Ten Athlete of the Year winners
People from Garfield County, Colorado